Lucio Cinti Luna (born 23 February 2000) is an Argentine rugby union player, currently playing for Premiership Rugby side London Irish. His preferred position is centre or wing.

Professional career
Cinti was named in the Argentine squad for the 2020 Tri Nations Series in October 2020. He was named in the side for Argentina's opening game of the tournament against New Zealand.

He joined Premiership Rugby side London Irish in October 2021.

References

External links
 

2000 births
Living people
Argentine rugby union players
Rugby union centres
Rugby union wings
Rugby sevens players at the 2020 Summer Olympics
Olympic medalists in rugby sevens
Medalists at the 2020 Summer Olympics
Olympic bronze medalists for Argentina
Rugby sevens players at the 2018 Summer Youth Olympics
Olympic rugby sevens players of Argentina
Sportspeople from La Plata
Youth Olympic gold medalists for Argentina